Group D of UEFA Euro 2016 contained defending European champion Spain, Czech Republic, Turkey and Croatia. This Euro 2016 group was the only with two former European champions – Spain (3 times) and Czech Republic (1 time, as Czechoslovakia). Matches were played from 12 to 21 June 2016.

Teams

Notes

Standings

In the round of 16,
The winner of Group D, Croatia, advanced to play the third-placed team of Group F, Portugal.
The runner-up of Group D, Spain, advanced to play the winner of Group E, Italy.

Matches

Turkey vs Croatia

Spain vs Czech Republic

Czech Republic vs Croatia

Spain vs Turkey

Czech Republic vs Turkey

Croatia vs Spain

References

External links
UEFA Euro 2016 Group D

UEFA Euro 2016
Spain at UEFA Euro 2016
Czech Republic at UEFA Euro 2016
Turkey at UEFA Euro 2016
Croatia at UEFA Euro 2016